Katrineholms SK is a Swedish sports club located in Katrineholm, with several departments:

 Katrineholms SK Bandy, bandy department, now defunct
 Katrineholms SK Fotboll, association football department